Yahoo! Music Radio (formerly known as LAUNCHcast) was an Internet radio service offered by Clear Channel Communications' iHeartRadio through Yahoo! Music. The service, formerly offered by LAUNCH Media, and originally developed by Todd Beaupré, Jason Snyder and Jeff Boulter, debuted on November 11, 1999, and was purchased by Yahoo! on June 28, 2001. Previously, LAUNCHcast combined with CBS Radio beginning in 2009, then iHeartRadio in 2012. The service closed in early 2014.

2001–2009: LAUNCHcast powered by Yahoo! Music

LAUNCHcast allowed users to create personal radio stations or playlists of songs tailored to their musical tastes.
To create a personal station, users rated music on a 4-star or 100-point (depending on one's preference) scale. The service used those ratings to create a personal station of songs based on a user's favorite genres, artists, albums, and songs. The generated playlist contained a combination of rated and recommended songs. The ratio of rated/recommended songs could be specified by each user, but by default it was 50/50.

A recommendation engine suggested songs that might have matched a user's particular musical taste according to the following similarity criteria:

 Songs from the same artist
 Songs from the same album
 Songs from the same genre
 Songs recommended by users with similar musical tastes
 Songs recommended by Yahoo!

Users were not required to participate in the ratings system to listen to music. Pre-programmed stations based on theme, genre, or artist were available throughout the Yahoo Music website.

Music videos could also be rated, allowing users to create personal music video channels as well. For legal reasons, specific songs could not be played whenever one wished. However, videos could be. The service could generate a personal video channel based on a single selection.

Users also had the option to turn off explicit lyrics while listening to their customized stations.

Free accounts
Users could share their personal stations publicly and listen to other users' stations.

When LAUNCHcast plus was implemented in January 2003, music was available for streaming for free at "Low" or "Medium" quality; although in 2007, these were combined into "Standard".

Between tracks, free accounts would hear commercial advertising for the Yahoo service and its partners and affiliates. The advertisements were generally 30 seconds. In 2007 Yahoo added permanent banner ads to the LAUNCHcast player.

Because LAUNCHcast was only compatible with Internet Explorer, an alternative was to use the Yahoo Music Engine, which was called Jukebox in version 2 of the same software. The Jukebox was unable to stream music anymore following September 2008, although it remained available for download well into the following year.

Limited skipping was available, at up to 5 skips per hour. Previously, banning a song skipped the song automatically, but this was removed in October 2003 with a redesign of their LAUNCHcast player. If the skips were not used in the previous hour, they did not roll over.

Free accounts were limited to playing up to 1000 songs/mo (up to 12,000/yr) without any special restrictions. A song could be skipped to bypass an undesired track, but skipped songs counted against the monthly allowance. If a free account user exceeded the monthly limit, the user would no longer be able to listen to LAUNCHcast radio for the remainder of the month, although they could listen to their personal station with no skips and at a lower bandwidth. Like skips, songs did not roll over to the next month.

Free users had access to only specific stations labeled "free". Such stations had a yellow headphones icon whereas premium stations had a blue plus icon.

Pausing was only possible after 30 seconds into the song, although a song could be skipped before the 30 seconds by pressing "stop" and then starting the station again.

LAUNCHcast Plus
On January 29, 2003, Yahoo has introduced a premium version of the LAUNCHcast service called LAUNCHcast Plus. Some users subscribed to this service on a monthly ($3.99/mo [$47.88/yr]) or annual basis ($35.88/yr [$2.99/mo]), or it came as bundled software from some ISPs (included in price) such as Verizon Yahoo online services. In addition to the features offered by the free account, LAUNCHcast Plus users received the following additional benefits:

"High" quality sound (CD-quality)
No commercials or banner ads
Access to all LAUNCHcast pre-programmed stations
Unlimited skipping
Unlimited monthly listening
Access to all artists, songs, and albums (subject to licensing restrictions by country)
The ability to designate other user's stations as "influencers" of one's own personal radio station
The ability to create "moods" (genre-based subsets of a user's personal radio station)
Pausing whenever you want

LAUNCHcast Plus was only offered in the US and Canada through Yahoo. On November 2, 2008, Verizon Yahoo announced via e-mail that certain services would be discontinued including LAUNCHcast Plus. In an e-mail delivered in January 2009, Yahoo states "the LAUNCHcast Plus premium service will be closing on February 12, 2009.". LAUNCHcast Plus was available to AT&T and Verizon subscribers at no charge previously.

2009–2012: LAUNCHcast/Yahoo! Music Radio powered by CBS

With the rise of royalty rates, Yahoo signed a deal with CBS Radio that effectively eliminated LAUNCHcast as it had previously existed, replacing it with Yahoo's 150 pre-programmed stations as well as CBS's local music, news/talk, and sports stations, and went by the name LAUNCHcast powered by CBS Radio. Yahoo Q&A pages attempted to downplay loss of functionality those changes entailed. Personalized stations ceased to exist, though for a short time Yahoo! did save previous users' song, artist and album ratings. Since the new format organized radio stations via genre, listeners had very limited range in what music they hear unless they regularly switch from station to station. The change also eliminated the feature that suggested songs and artists based on the user's ratings. Listeners had the option to listen to those stations in high quality (broadband) audio as well as using the 6 skips-per-hour (not applicable on local stations). One way around the inability to skip songs was to simply hit the browser's refresh button. While it took time for the page to reload, it was faster than waiting for a song to finish.

Listeners were allowed to use the out-of-five rating feature that influenced the stations. While banning a song entirely was impossible, giving a song a one-star rating had it played very rarely. The rating tool was discontinued from the Yahoo Music Radio player on September 21 for a time until it was restored on November 2. Ratings in the new player were not saved back into Yahoo! users listings, and as of 2012, Yahoo Music and CBS Radio did not associate radio ratings with their profiles. Yahoo encouraged users to rate songs, artists, and albums throughout their site as well as through their recommendations based on their tastes, though there was little benefit to the listener in doing so. In its first incarnation, play-on-demand was not provided, as with rewind, playback, and fast-forward.

Many ads could be skipped. However, some cannot and many disable all buttons, forcing the listener to hear the ad before any music is played. Ads which can be skipped have no label or video. However, skipping ads accounts toward the hourly skip limit. Ads disabling all buttons are, as of March 2009, advertising hair products. Such ads often play upon the player's launch, and some of them have a video, which caused problems due to increased memory usage. An occasional Nesquik ad disabled the pause and skip buttons, but the channel can be changed. Refreshing the web page would generally work to skip adds.

As with the old service, unused skips did not roll-over. However, LAUNCHcast by CBS provided unlimited listening.

For the first time, LAUNCHcast powered by CBS Radio was also available to Firefox and Safari users. It was also available as an app on the iPhone.

The fan radio feature has returned to LAUNCHcast 5 months after CBS' takeover. Listeners could access the fan stations in the artist page by clicking on the "Artist Radio" link that corresponded with the artist/group. They also had the option to type in their favorite artist in the player itself.

Unlike its old service, Yahoo Radio by CBS did not have the option for users to turn off explicit lyrics. Although a hard rock or a hip-hop station may have edited content, some explicit songs were mixed in there. The user would either tolerate such raw language, skip the song, or change the station.

Since the merger, the LAUNCHcast branding slowly diminished, although LAUNCHcast was still verbally mentioned during some of their commercial breaks until March 2010.

On February 4, 2010, Yahoo Music Radio banned users outside the U.S. from streaming online radio. An error message points to Last FM. "We're sorry, this station is unavailable from your current location. Instead, enjoy listening to...."

In July 2010, it was renamed as Yahoo! Music Radio powered by Radio.com with the launch of CBS Radio's Radio.com service (since March 2021, it is now known as Audacy), and another redesign of its Yahoo! Music Radio player.

Since July 2011, many Yahoo users reported that the LAUNCHcast plugin for Yahoo Messenger no longer worked. User attempts to contact customer service have been unsuccessful.

2012–2013/14: Yahoo Music Radio powered by iHeartRadio
On June 28, 2012, Yahoo Music severed ties with CBS Radio and formed a new alliance with Clear Channel's iHeartRadio. The radio page was given a complete redesign, and much of the pre-programmed stations on Yahoo Music's roster has been eliminated and replaced by over 1,000 live broadcast and digital-only stations. For a couple examples: the "Indie Rock" station has been redirected to Los Angeles-based KCRW's Eclectic24 station, and "Today's Big Hits" has been redirected to WHYI-FM in Miami, Florida or any suggested Top 40/KISS-FM station. Unlike Yahoo! Radio's previous 2 services, listeners use the "Thumbs Up/Thumbs Down" rating tool to rate the songs they like or don't. The new deal also gives users the ability to create personalized stations based on their favorite artist or song. Users have the option to turn off explicit lyrics, but that would disable customization altogether. To rate and create customized channels, Yahoo users would have to sign up with iHeartRadio.

This made Yahoo the exclusive web and mobile destination for fans of the 2012 iHeartRadio Music Festival, which took place Sept. 21–22 at the MGM Grand Hotel in Las Vegas, Nevada. Additionally, Yahoo became Clear Channel's web and mobile live webcast partner for 11 more live events that year.

Closure
Although Yahoo!'s deal with iHeartRadio continued well into the following years, sometime in late 2013/early 2014 Yahoo! Music's radio page has been discontinued without an announcement, redirecting visitors to the main Yahoo! Music page. This signified Yahoo! Music's end of its internet radio services. Yahoo's Music page would also meet its demise 4 years later as it merged with Yahoo's Entertainment page. Concurrently, Yahoo!'s deal with iHeartRadio ended quietly upon the web company's acquisition into Oath, Inc..

Geographic availability
The free version of LAUNCHcast was available in most areas of the world. However, content was varied by country due to music licensing restrictions.

The LAUNCHcast Plus premium service was widely available in the United States and Canada. In the United Kingdom it was restricted to BT Yahoo! Internet customers.

In Canada, LAUNCHcast and LAUNCHcast Plus was dismantled altogether as of April 15, 2009. In Australia, their LAUNCHcast service was rebranded "Yahoo Music Radio" until they dismantled it on July 7, 2009. Many other countries followed suit prior to the relaunch of Yahoo Music worldwide sites.

Technological requirements
The LAUNCHcast music player (from development date to February 2009) required Microsoft's Windows Media Player 9.0 or higher to function, although it could not be streamed from the Windows Media Player itself. Before the merger with CBS Radio, LAUNCHcast only worked with Microsoft's Internet Explorer 6.0 and up web browser with Flash 6.0 or higher, and in Yahoo!'s Messenger and Music Engine programs on the Microsoft Windows operating system 98, ME, 2000 Professional, and XP (Home and Professional). In Firefox web browser, LAUNCHcast did not load properly or without extra configuration work.

According to Yahoo, the LAUNCHcast music player was not compatible with the Mac OS X or Linux operating systems, however as of February 16, 2009; that wasn't the case anymore. Yahoo stated that following CBS's acquisition, loading the player in Firefox would become possible.

Since the relaunch of LAUNCHcast by CBS, users were only required to download the latest Flash Player plug-in (currently Version 10). See external links (below) for Yahoo's help page on system requirements. The requirement still stands with the Yahoo/iHeartRadio merger.

Video
Before moving to only use Windows Media, early video playback offered the choice of Windows Media Player or RealPlayer, of which the latter was cross-platform and available for Linux.

After Windows Media was made the only delivery format, requiring Windows Media Player 6.4 or 7.1 at the minimum, Firefox failed to play videos. To work around this, users had to carefully set up a specialised Windows Media ActiveX extension for Firefox, and (temporarily) tweak the browser user agent with the User Agent Switcher extension to identify as Internet Explorer 6.0 in order to play content. This only worked in Windows and not in Linux.

Browser and operating system compatibility issues were largely rectified after the default player was changed to Flash Player, which was cross-platform to the extent that it supported at least Windows, Mac, and Linux.

Legal troubles
On April 27, 2007, Yahoo defeated Sony BMG in a copyright infringement lawsuit involving LAUNCHcast's personalization features. At issue was whether or not LAUNCHcast's "personal radio station" constitutes an "interactive" service, which requires a negotiated license agreement with a record company, or a "non-interactive" service, which requires a cheaper "compulsory license" from SoundExchange. In an "interactive" service, users can play songs on demand, but with LAUNCHcast they can only influence whether or not a particular song appears in their station.

After a six-year litigation, a jury decided that LAUNCHcast was not required to negotiate licenses as an "interactive" service, and that the service's compulsory licenses as a "non-interactive" service were sufficient. The plaintiffs appealed the decision but on August 21, 2009 the United States Court of Appeals for the Second Circuit upheld the lower court's decision, finding that users did not have sufficient control over the playlists generated by LAUNCHcast to render it an "interactive service".

See also

 Yahoo Music
 AOL Radio

References

Music Radio
Internet radio stations in the United States
Radio stations established in 1999
Radio stations disestablished in 2014
Defunct radio stations in the United States